Annie Wilkes is the main antagonist in the 1987 novel Misery, by Stephen King. In the 1990 film adaptation of the novel, Wilkes was portrayed by Kathy Bates, who won the Academy Award for Best Actress for her portrayal.

A nurse by training, she has become one of the stereotypes of the nurse as a torturer and angel of mercy.

Character background

The novel provides Wilkes' backstory, stating that she was born in Bakersfield, California, on April 1, 1943, and graduated from the University of Southern California's nursing school with honors in 1966. After several years of working in hospitals across the country, she settled in a remote portion of Colorado's Western Slope.

In both the book and film, Wilkes rescues protagonist Paul Sheldon after he breaks both of his legs in a car accident, and takes him to her home to convalesce. She fawns over Sheldon, a writer of romance novels starring her favorite literary character, Misery Chastain; she professes to be his "number one fan" and says that she loves him. She also implies that she has visited the hotel where Sheldon finishes his novels as he was staying there. These statements, and the fact that she is not in a hurry to take him to a hospital, make Sheldon uneasy. He has studied psychological disorders as part of his research for the Misery series, and suspects early on that Wilkes is mentally unstable.

Wilkes is furious when she discovers Sheldon killed off Misery at the end of his latest novel. She tells him she has not called a hospital or told anybody about him and makes a veiled threat on his life. She holds him captive in her home and subjects him to a series of physical and psychological tortures. She also forces him to burn the only copy of a novel he felt would put him back on track as a mainstream author, and then makes him write a new novel bringing Misery back to life. Sheldon writes the book as Wilkes wants, but bridles at her treatment of him and manages to sneak out of his room several times while she is away.

On one of his trips out of his room, Sheldon finds Wilkes' old scrapbook and learns from the newspaper clippings inside that she is a serial killer whose spree dates back to her childhood in Bakersfield. Among her victims were a neighboring family, her own father, her college roommate, and a hitchhiker with whom she had a brief fling. Sheldon also learns that she killed several patients at other hospitals where she worked, but no one suspected foul play because the victims were either elderly or gravely injured. However, while serving as head maternity nurse at a hospital in Boulder, eleven infants in her care died under mysterious circumstances. She was tried for their deaths, but acquitted due to lack of evidence. Sheldon also finds that Wilkes was formerly married to a physical therapist named Ralph Dugan, who later divorced her, citing "mental cruelty". The last picture is an article about Sheldon's own disappearance, leading him to fear that he is Wilkes' next victim.

Sheldon does not know it, but Wilkes has known all along that he has been sneaking around her house. This sets off one of the film's most infamous scenes, in which she breaks his ankles with a sledgehammer to stop him from escaping. In the book, she chops off his foot with an axe and cauterizes it with a blowtorch and later cuts off one of his thumbs with an electric knife when he complains about a missing letter on his typewriter (neither of these things happen in the film).

In the book, Wilkes murders a Colorado state trooper who sees Sheldon in her house by stabbing him with a wooden cross and running him over with a lawnmower. In the film, the local sheriff comes to Wilkes' farm to investigate Sheldon's disappearance. Wilkes drugs Sheldon and hides him in her basement before subsequently killing the officer by shooting him in the back with a double-barreled shotgun when he hears Sheldon's cries for help.

Wilkes then says they should "celebrate" the new novel in a murder–suicide. Sheldon pretends to go along with it, telling her he needs a bottle of Dom Pérignon champagne and a cigarette, as per his usual practice after finishing a book. He soaks the manuscript with lighter fluid he picked up in the basement and sets it ablaze. While Wilkes tries to put the fire out, Sheldon overpowers her by cracking her over the head with his typewriter and choking her. In the film, he chokes her with pages of the burnt novel. In the book, he chokes her with blank pages which she believes to be the book; the real novel is hidden from sight and was later published.

She ultimately dies of a fractured skull; Sheldon is then rescued by police. In the book, she fractures her skull when she slips and falls against the mantle of the guest room bed. When the police go in to search the bedroom where Wilkes is believed to have died, they find it empty. It is later revealed that, despite being mortally wounded, she managed to escape the bedroom and died in her barn with her hands on a chainsaw, which she presumably intended to use on Sheldon. In the movie, Sheldon trips her up so she falls and cracks her head on the corner of the typewriter she forced him to use; she recovers from this and attacks him, but he kills her by ramming a metal statue of her pet sow pig – named Misery after his stories – into her head.

Personality 
King characterizes Annie Wilkes as a cunning, brutal and devious woman who hides her malice behind a cheery façade. Both the novel and the film portray her as extremely paranoid, and also suggest that she may have borderline personality disorder. In the novel, she has day-long bouts with depression, during which she is seen maiming herself; Sheldon also finds evidence that she gorges herself on vast quantities of food. She has an unhealthy obsession with romance novels, particularly Sheldon's Misery series.
 
She abhors profanity, to the point that she will fly into fits of rage if it is used in front of her. She instead expresses anger with childishly strange words and phrases like "cockadoodie", "mister man", "dirty bird", "dirty birdy", "oogie", "fiddely-foof" and "rooty-patooties". In the novel, however, she lets more conventional profanities slip on occasion. And in both the book and the film adaptation, she refers to Sheldon as a "cocksucker" while promising to kill him during the final fight scene. She has violent tantrums over insignificant matters. For instance, when Sheldon complains that the packet of Eaton's Corrasable Bond paper she bought for him is smudge-prone, she smashes his still-healing knee; in the book, when he mentions that her typewriter is missing a key, she cuts off his thumb.

King has noted that Wilkes "may seem psychopathic to us, but it's important to remember that she seems perfectly sane and reasonable to herself – heroic, in fact, a beleaguered woman trying to survive in a hostile world filled with cockadoodie brats".

In a special feature on the collectors' edition DVD, forensic psychologist Reid Meloy said that Wilkes' personality (as portrayed by Kathy Bates) is a virtual catalog of mental illness. According to Meloy, Wilkes has bipolar disorder, where someone can have manic psychoses as well as depressions. He also believes her profile is typical of people who stalk celebrities, although she more accurately depicts borderline personality disorder, often confused for bipolar disorder.

In his commentary on the film available on the DVD, director Rob Reiner notes that Wilkes is loosely based on that of Genene Jones, a nurse who is believed to have killed as many as 50 children who were in her care over a two-year period.

Other appearances 

The fictional version of King that appears in The Dark Tower VII: The Dark Tower (2004) discusses Annie Wilkes.

Annie Wilkes is mentioned in Kim Newman's novella, The Other Side of Midnight. In the novel, which is set in Newman's alternate history crossover Anno Dracula series, Wilkes is the murderer of John Lennon. When she is arrested for the crime, she tells the press that she loved Lennon, but that he had to die for splitting up the Beatles.

Kathy Bates reprised her role as Annie Wilkes in a 2008 commercial for DirecTV, with the setting being the infamous scene where she breaks Paul Sheldon's ankles.

The Tamil film Julie Ganapathi (2003), directed by Balu Mahendra, is based loosely on the novel. South Indian actress Saritha plays the film's title character, who is based on the Annie Wilkes character.

The novel was later adapted into a play, which ran on Broadway from November 2015 to February 2016. Annie was played by Laurie Metcalf. At the 70th Annual Tony Awards, Metcalf was nominated for Best Actress in a Play for her performance.

There are also two Finnish play adaptations called Piina based on the 1990 film adaptation's screenplay by William Goldman. In one of them, Annie Wilkes is played by Mari Turunen and in another, by Henna Haverinen.

A version of a young Annie Wilkes appears in the TV series Castle Rock, and is portrayed by Lizzy Caplan.

In the first series of RuPaul's Drag Race: UK Versus the World, contestant Baga Chipz portrayed Kathy Bates as Annie Wilkes for the show’s signature Snatch Game celebrity impersonation challenge, for which she was named one of the two challenge winners.

Reception
The American Film Institute included Wilkes (as played by Bates) in their "100 Heroes and Villains" list, ranking her as the 17th most iconic villain (and sixth most iconic villainess) in film history.

During an interview in April 2022, King selected Wilkes as his top pick character, just saying that "she [Wilkes] was fun".

References

External links 
 
 American Film Institute

Castle Rock (franchise)
Characters in American novels of the 20th century
Female horror film villains
Female literary villains
Female villains
Fictional characters from California
Fictional characters from Colorado
Fictional characters with bipolar disorder
Fictional characters with borderline personality disorder
Fictional characters with psychiatric disorders
Fictional murderers of children
Fictional hermits
Fictional kidnappers
Fictional female murderers
Fictional nurses
Fictional patricides
Fictional serial killers
Fictional stalkers
Fictional torturers
Literary characters introduced in 1987
Stephen King characters
Fictional bibliophiles
Fictional people from the 20th-century